Railroad Valley is one of the Central Nevada Desert Basins in the Tonopah Basin and is about  long north-south and up to  wide, with some southern areas running southwest to northeast.

Description
The southern end of the valley begins near Gray Top Mountain (elevation ) and stretches north all the way to Mount Hamilton (elevation ). To the east are the Quinn Canyon, Grant, and White Pine Ranges, while to the west are the Pancake and Reveille Ranges. Most of the valley lies in Nye County, but it crosses into White Pine County at its northern end. The valley includes numerous springs including Kate Springs and Blue Eagle Springs, ranches such as the Blue Eagle Ranch, and 2 Tonopah Playas.

The valley has 4 separate Wildlife Management Areas ("Railroad Valley WMA"), and valley communities include Currant, Crows Nest, Green Springs, Lockes, and Nyala. Most of Nevada's oil production (totalling about 553,000 barrels during 2002) comes from several small oil fields in Railroad Valley, including Eagle Springs, Trap Spring, and Grant Canyon oil fields.

The valley is the ancestral home of the Tsaidüka band of Western Shoshone, who are now enrolled in the Duckwater Shoshone Tribe of the Duckwater Reservation.

See also
 List of valleys of Nevada

References

External links

Valleys of Nevada
Valleys of Nye County, Nevada
Valleys of White Pine County, Nevada